Roger Hill (July 31, 1948 – February 20, 2014) was an American actor.

Career
Born in the Bronx, Hill played the role of Cyrus in the 1979 film The Warriors. He also portrayed the character of Lil John in the 1974 film The Education of Sonny Carson, and  took on the role of Ernest Clay in the 1976 TV movie Hazard's People starring John Houseman. After his work in The Warriors, Hill performed in the ABC Daytime soap opera One Life to Live playing the part of Alex Lowndes from 1983–1985. He was in Hart to Hart episode Murder, Murder on the Wall.

Hill was chosen to portray the doomed gang lord Cyrus in The Warriors after the original actor chosen for the part, a real life gang leader, mysteriously disappeared just before filming started.

In 2006, Hill filed a lawsuit of $250,000 against Take-Two for using his voice and depiction in The Warriors video game. He claimed that it would not have been difficult for Take-Two to pay, since the game made $37 million. A spokesman for Take-Two stated that the company "has a valid third-party license for the rights to use Roger Hill's likeness and the character of Cyrus in The Warriors video game and related marketing materials".

Personal life
Hill was the father of film editor Chris Hill. Hill died of a heart attack in February 2014 at the age of 65.

Selected filmography

References

External links
 

1948 births
2014 deaths
20th-century American male actors
African-American male actors
American male film actors
American male soap opera actors
American male television actors
Male actors from New York City
20th-century African-American people
21st-century African-American people